The Pulau River is a major river in South Papua province of Indonesia, with a total length of .

Name 
It was previously known as the Eilanden River based on Dutch colonial expedition maps, and was still shown with this name on some government maps in the 2010s.

Hydrology 
It flows south out of the mountains, and then follows a south-southwesterly course to the Arafura Sea on the Casuarina Coast. Important tributaries include the Baliem River (formerly Vriendschaps River), Wildeman River, Kampung River and Brazza River.

Geography
The river flows in the southern area of Western New Guinea with predominantly a tropical rainforest climate (designated as Af in the Köppen-Geiger climate classification). The average annual rainfall is 4,000- . The wettest month is May, with an average of  rainfall, and the driest is July, with  rainfall.

See also
List of rivers of Indonesia
List of rivers of Western New Guinea

References 

Rivers of South Papua
Rivers of Indonesia